The 2016 Algerian Super Cup was the  10th edition of Algerian Super Cup, a football match contested by the winners of the 2015–16 Algerian Ligue Professionnelle 1 and 2015–16 Algerian Cup competitions. The match was played on November 1, 2016, at Stade Mustapha Tchaker in Blida between 2015-16 Ligue 1 winners USM Alger and 2015–16 Algerian Cup winners MC Alger.

Match details

See also
 2015–16 Algerian Ligue Professionnelle 1
 2015–16 Algerian Cup

Notes

References 

2016
USM Alger matches
Supercup